The Curry County Reporter is a weekly newspaper in Gold Beach, Oregon.  It was established in 1914, and has a circulation of 2180.

History 
Founded in 1914 by E. M. Bogardus as the Gold Beach Reporter, the Gold Beach paper was sold in 1917 to A. E. Guyton and John A. Juza, with Juza assuming complete ownership in 1922 and W.E. Hassler becoming editor. In 1956 it was purchased by Robert and Betty Van Leer. It gradually expanded though the 1980s, at which point it employed six full time and two part time workers. Robert and Betty Van Leer passed it to Jim and Molly Walker, their daughter and son-in-law. in 1997. It was bought by Matt and Kim Hall, owners of the Port Orford News in February 2016.

References

External links 
 Official Website

Oregon Newspaper Publishers Association
Publications established in 1914
Newspapers published in Oregon
Gold Beach, Oregon
1914 establishments in Oregon
Curry County, Oregon